The Man Who Changed His Name may refer to: 
 The Man Who Changed His Name (play), a 1928 mystery play by Edgar Wallace
 The Man Who Changed His Name (1928 film), a silent film adaptation
 The Man Who Changed His Name (1934 film), a sound film adaptation